P24 or P-24 may refer to:

Aviation 
 Fairey P.24 Monarch, a British aircraft engine
 Lockheed YP-24, an American prototype fighter aircraft
 PZL P.24, a Polish fighter aircraft

Molecular biology 
 P24 capsid protein, a protein of HIV
 P24 protein family, a group of transmembrane proteins
 Pseudomonas sRNA P24

Other uses 
 , of the Armed Forces of Malta
 Ndonde language
 P24 road (Ukraine)
 Papyrus 24, a biblical manuscript